Paul Jacobs is a Republican member of the Illinois House from the 115th district since January 13, 2021. The 115th district includes all or parts of Alto Pass, Anna, Ashley, Ava, Belle Rive, Bluford, Bonnie, Campbell Hill, Carbondale, Centralia, Cobden, De Soto, Dix, Dongola, Du Bois, Du Quoin, Elkville, Gorham, Grand Tower, Harrison, Ina, Jonesboro, Makanda, Mill Creek, Mount Vernon, Murphysboro, Nashville, Opdyke, Pinckneyville, Radom, Richview, St. Johns, Tamaroa, Vergennes, Waltonville, and Woodlawn.

Jacobs was elected to succeed then-state Representative Terri Bryant after she successfully ran for the Illinois Senate.

Early life, education, and career
Jacobs was born in Pomona, Illinois. He served in the United States Navy from 1965 to 1971. He has been an optometrist for the Southern Illinois region since 1970. He and his wife Rhoda built and owned the Von Jakob Winery in Alto Pass, Illinois in 1997 and would later retire from the winery at an unknown date.

As of July 3, 2022, Representative Jacobs is a member of the following Illinois House committees:

 Appropriations - Higher Education Committee (HAPI)
 Health Care Availability & Access Committee (HHCA)
 Health Care Licenses Committee (HHCL)
 Higher Education Committee (HHED)
 Tourism Committee (SHTO)
 Veterans' Affairs Committee (HVET)

Electoral history

Personal life
Jacobs currently resides in Pomona, Illinois and is married to his wife Rhoda. He has "four grown children and ten grandchildren." He is a lifelong Christian.

References

External links
Representative Paul Jacobs (R) at the Illinois General Assembly
Constituent Website

21st-century American politicians
American Christians
Republican Party members of the Illinois House of Representatives
Living people
Year of birth missing (living people)